Valery Ilyich Kuzmin (7 November 1918 – 1 June 1983) was an aviation pioneer in Yakutia who became the director of the Yakutsk division of Aeroflot, the Soviet state airline, a recipient of the titles Honoured Pilot of the USSR as well as Hero of Socialist Labor. He was also the first ethnic Yakut pilot.

References

1918 births
1983 deaths
People from Olyokminsky District
Heroes of Socialist Labour
Recipients of the Order of Lenin
Recipients of the Order of the Red Banner of Labour
Recipients of the Order of the Red Star
Soviet aviators
Yakut people